Elmhurst is a city mostly in DuPage County and overlapping into Cook County in the U.S. state of Illinois, and a western suburb of Chicago.

History

Members of the Potawatomi Native American people, who settled along Salt Creek just south of where the city would develop, are the earliest known settlers of the Elmhurst area. Around 1836, European-American immigrants settled on tracts of land along the same creek. At what would become Elmhurst City Centre, a native of Ohio named Gerry Bates established a community on a tract of "treeless land" in 1842.

The following year, Hill Cottage Tavern opened where St. Charles Road and Cottage Hill Avenue presently intersect. In 1845, the community was officially named Cottage Hill when a post office was established. Four years later, the Galena and Chicago Union Railroad was given right-of-way through Cottage Hill giving farmers easier access to Chicago. The first Elmhurst railroad station was built in 1894. The community changed its name to Elmhurst in 1869. In 1871, Elmhurst University was organized and currently has 3,500 undergraduates and about 300 graduate students. Elmhurst was incorporated as a village in 1882, with a population between 723 and 1,050, and legal boundaries of St. Charles Road to North Avenue, and one half mile west and one quarter mile east of York Street. Elmhurst Memorial Hospital was founded in 1926 as the first hospital in DuPage County.

The Memorial Parade has run every Memorial Day since 1918. The annual Elmhurst St. Patrick's Day Parade continues to be the third largest parade of that sort in the Chicago area, following the more famous parades downtown and on the city's South Side.

Since 1964, it has been home to Elmhurst CRC, one of the largest congregations of the Christian Reformed Church in North America.

The Keebler Company's corporate headquarters was in Elmhurst until 2001, when the Kellogg Company purchased the company. The city is home to the headquarters of Sunshine Biscuits and McMaster-Carr Supply Co. Famous Amos cookies are also distributed from Elmhurst.

In 2014, Family Circle magazine ranked Elmhurst as one of the "Ten Best U.S. Towns for Families".

Geography

The town also has a tendency to flood, and the city has tried preventing or suppressing this for the future.

Demographics

As of the 2020 census there were 45,786 people, 16,808 households, and 12,110 families residing in the city. The racial makeup of the city was 80.47% White, 6.51% Asian, 2.14% African American, 0.26% Native American, 0.02% Pacific Islander, 2.92% from other races, and 7.67% from two or more races. Hispanic or Latino of any race were 9.32% of the population.

There were 16,808 households, out of which 67.66% had children under the age of 18 living with them, 63.37% were married couples living together, 6.49% had a female householder with no husband present, and 27.95% were non-families. 24.44% of all households were made up of individuals, and 13.61% had someone living alone who was 65 years of age or older. The average household size was 3.26 and the average family size was 2.70.

The city's age distribution consisted of 25.1% under the age of 18, 8.6% from 18 to 24, 21.3% from 25 to 44, 28.4% from 45 to 64, and 16.5% who were 65 years of age or older. The median age was 40.7 years. For every 100 females, there were 96.9 males. For every 100 females age 18 and over, there were 94.8 males.

The median income for a household in the city was $123,869, and the median income for a family was $148,663. Males had a median income of $83,584 versus $46,935 for females. The per capita income for the city was $59,911. About 2.1% of families and 3.4% of the population were below the poverty line, including 3.0% of those under age 18 and 4.5% of those age 65 or over.

Economy

Top employers
According to Elmhurst's 2017 Comprehensive Annual Financial Report, the top employers in the city are:

Arts and culture
 The Theatre Historical Society of America is focused on the preservation of dance, opera, and movie theaters and includes a collection of objects from many theaters that are no longer in existence. Among the items on display is a scale model of the 1927 Avalon Theater (now known as the New Regal Theater).
 Wilder Park Conservatory
A tunnel from Salt Creek diverts water into the quarry in case of a flood.
 Each spring, the company RGL Marketing for the Arts runs the event, Art in Wilder Park. The event takes place in centrally located Wilder Park, which is also home to the Wilder Mansion, the Elmhurst Public Library, the Wilder Park Conservatory and the Lizzadro Museum of Lapidary Art. The event "features of a juried show of fine arts, crafts and original creations of over 100 artists, including jewelry, glass, ceramics, painting, wood, photography, sculpture, paper and mixed media." The event also hosts live music and entertainment and over 40 food vendors.
 Elmhurst is home to multiple residential homes built by significant architects, including but not limited to Mies van der Rohe (McCormick House), Frank Lloyd Wright (F.B. Henderson House), Walter Burley Griffin (William H. Emery House, Sloane House), and R. Harold Zook.

Government

Timeline for Elmhurst's leadership:
 1882 - Incorporated as a village in June.
 1882 - Henry Glos elected as first village president.
 1887 - Peter Wolf elected as village president.
 1902 - Edwin Heidemann elected as village president.
 1905 - Henry C. Schumacher elected as village president.
 1908 - C. J. Albert elected as village president.
 1910 - Adopted city form of government.
 1910 - Henry C. Schumacher elected as first city mayor.
 1912 - F. W. M. Hammerschmidt elected as mayor.
 1919 - Otto Balgemann elected as mayor.
 1931 - Edward Blatter elected as mayor.
 1933 - Claude Van Auken elected as mayor.
 1945 - William S. Fellows elected as mayor.
 1951 - Ervin F. Wilson elected as mayor.
 1957 - Benjamin Allison elected as mayor.
 1961 - Charles Weigel elected as mayor.
 1973 - Ray W. Fick, Jr. elected as mayor.
 1977 - Abner Ganet elected as mayor.
 1985 - Robert J. Quinn elected as mayor.
 1989 - Charles H. Garrigues elected as mayor.
 1993 - Thomas D. Marcucci elected as mayor.
 2009 - Peter P. DiCianni elected as mayor.
 2013 - Steven Morley elected as mayor.
 2021 - Scott M. Levin elected as mayor.

Education

Elmhurst University is a local college of the area. It is a four-year private liberal arts college affiliated with the United Church of Christ.

School districts serving Elmhurst include:
 Elmhurst Community Unit School District 205 serves most of the city; its high school is York Community High School
 Salt Creek School District 48
 DuPage High School District 88
 Hillside School District 93 serves the Cook County portion; in 1953 this portion had 45 houses
 Students at Hillside 93 move on to Proviso West High School of the Proviso Township High Schools District 209

Private schools:
 IC Catholic Prep, formerly Immaculate Conception High School
 Timothy Christian School
 Immaculate Conception Grade School
 Immanuel Lutheran Grade School
 Visitation Catholic Grade School

Infrastructure

Transportation
Elmhurst is served by Pace buses, and the Metra Union Pacific/West Line. The Union Pacific Railroad has freight service on the Metra line and Canadian National Railway serves the former Illinois Central line south of the Metra line. O'Hare International Airport is 18 minutes from Elmhurst, and Chicago Midway International Airport is 33 minutes from Elmhurst.

During the summers and December, Elmhurst also has the "Elmhurst Express Trolley". A free weekend trolley that connects downtown Elmhurst to the Spring Road businesses and the Elmhurst Public Library. It runs Friday-Saturday and the $40,000 cost comes out of visiting and tourism fund.

Notable people

References

External links

 

 
1842 establishments in Illinois
Chicago metropolitan area
Cities in Cook County, Illinois
Cities in DuPage County, Illinois
Cities in Illinois
Populated places established in 1842